Frank H. Gorton (1877 – March 20, 1939) was an American football, basketball, baseball, and track and field coach. He served as the head football coach at Rutgers University from 1906 to 1907, Occidental College from 1908 to 1910, the Virginia Military Institute (VMI) from 1914 to 1916, and Otterbein College—now known as Otterbein University—in 1917, compiling a career college football record of 38–29–6. Gorton was also the head basketball coach at Rutgers from 1906 to 1909, at VMI from 1914 to 1917, and at Otterbein College during the 1917–18 season, amassing a career college basketball mark of 33–31. In addition, he served as the head baseball coach at Rutgers in 1907. Gorton returned to VMI in 1926 to serve as the school's athletic director.

Gorton died at the age of 62 of a heart attack in Lexington, Virginia on March 20, 1939.

Head coaching record

Football

Basketball

References

External links
 

1877 births
1939 deaths
Fisk Bulldogs football coaches
Occidental Tigers football coaches
Otterbein Cardinals men's basketball coaches
Otterbein Cardinals football coaches
Rochester Yellowjackets football coaches
Rochester Yellowjackets track and field coaches
Rutgers Scarlet Knights baseball coaches
Rutgers Scarlet Knights football coaches
Rutgers Scarlet Knights men's basketball coaches
VMI Keydets athletic directors
VMI Keydets football coaches
VMI Keydets basketball coaches
VMI Keydets track and field coaches